Leigh Manson is a Scottish football manager and the founder and current president of Nike Total Football in Japan. Manson has been coaching with the sport for 20 years, he has also played in numerous clubs like the Queen of the South and Gretna in Scotland and the Richmond Kickers in the United States. He also served as head coach of Global which then competed in the United Football League.

Football career
Leigh Manson is the founder and president of Total Football in Japan. He was licensed as a Union of European Football Associations (UEFA) B coach with numerous awards from the Scottish Football Association.

He was a part of the training of Philippines national under-23 football team as their preparation to the 2013 Southeast Asian Games. They held their training with the squad every day for two weeks.

Global
Brian Reid was replaced by Manson to coach for Global, a Philippine-based football club. He made his debut in the United Football League, the premier football league in the country against Loyola Meralco Sparks in a 4–0 loss.

Davao Aguilas
In May 2018, Manson was hired by the Philippines Football League club, Davao Aguilas F.C. as an assistant coach to their newly appointed head coach, Melchor Anzures.

Managerial statistics

Honours 
Global FC
United Football League: 2014
Runners-up: 2015
UFL Cup: 2016
UFL FA Cup: 2014
 UFL FA League Cup
Runners-up: 2014
PFF Club Championship
Runners-up: 2014–15

References 

Living people
Scottish footballers
Scottish football managers
Scottish expatriate football managers
Queen of the South F.C. players
Richmond Kickers players
Gretna F.C. players
Expatriate football managers in the Philippines
United Football League (Philippines) head coaches
Global Makati F.C. managers
Association footballers not categorized by position
Scottish expatriate sportspeople in the United States
Expatriate soccer players in the United States
Scottish expatriate footballers
Year of birth missing (living people)